Eugen Zintgraff (born 16 January 1858 in Düsseldorf; died 4 December 1897 on Tenerife) was a German explorer.

Work 
In 1886, he was sent by the German Foreign Ministry to carry out the explorations in Kamerun. He ascended the Wouri River as far as the cataract of Jabassi. He also traced the course of the Old Calabar River 
into the country of the Banyang and established Batom station. In 
1889 Zintgraff embarked on a major expedition to the northeast, 
becoming the first European to break out of the coastal jungles of 
Cameroons, climbed into Babessong (Ashong) from where his party traveled to Bali Nyonga. Proceeding even further north, he arrived at the end of May 1888 at 
Ibi on the Benue River.

References 

German explorers of Africa
People from Düsseldorf
1858 births
1897 deaths